Earl Carroll Sketchbook is a 1946 American musical film directed by Albert S. Rogell and written by Frank Gill Jr. and Parke Levy. The film stars Constance Moore, William Marshall, Bill Goodwin, Johnny Coy, Barbara Jo Allen and Edward Everett Horton. It was released on August 22, 1946 by Republic Pictures.

Plot
Jingle writer Ty Bruce and secretary Pam Thayer have grand ambitions; Ty wishes to become a serious songwriter and Pam a singer. Advertising agent Lynn Stafford tries to attract Ty's romantic interest, while Pam's roommate Sherry Lane offers to help her audition one of Ty's tunes for the Earl Carroll Sketchbook, a big New York revue.

Carroll's stage manager Rick Castle offers Pam a job, liking her voice but also mistakenly believing that she had written the song. After Pam catches Ty kissing Lynn, Pam feigns amnesia. Ty gradually realizes how much he cares for Pam, and both are hired by the revue.

Cast 
  
Constance Moore as Pamela Thayer
William Marshall as Tyler Brice
Bill Goodwin as Rick Castle
Johnny Coy as Johnny
Barbara Jo Allen as Sherry Lane 
Edward Everett Horton as Dr. Milo Edwards
Hillary Brooke as Lynn Stafford
Dorothy Babb as Babs
Robert Homans as Pop Edgar
Ray Walker as Agent Sammy Harris
 Sarah Padden as 	Mrs. Murphy 
 Russell Hicks as John Hawks 
 Frances Morris as 	Nurse 
 Bobbie Dorree as	Blonde

References

External links 
 

1946 films
1940s English-language films
American musical films
1946 musical films
Republic Pictures films
Films directed by Albert S. Rogell
American black-and-white films
1940s American films
English-language musical films